Tiantongyuannan Station is a station on Line 5 of the Beijing Subway.

Station Layout 
The station has 2 elevated side platforms.

Exits 
There is 1 exit, A, which is accessible.

References

External links
 

Beijing Subway stations in Changping District
Railway stations in China opened in 2007